The Bread and Cheese Club was a Melbourne-based Australian art and literary society and publisher.  It was founded in June 1938 with the purpose of fostering “Mateship, Art and Letters”.  Its membership was all male.  It promoted Australian writers and published about 40 books, as well as a magazine.  The person principally involved in founding and running the organisation was book collector J. K. Moir, the club's “Knight Grand Cheese” from its foundation until 1952.  Following Moir's death in 1958 the club went into a decline and eventually closed in 1988.

Publications
Bohemia, subtitled "the all-Australian literary magazine", was published from 1939 to 1967.  Other publications, mainly of poetry and personal tributes issued in the 1940s, include:

 Allan, J. Alex (1940),  Revolution
 Anon. (1940). Catalogue: Australian art and literature exhibition, sponsored by the Bread and Cheese Club
 Anon. (1942), John Shaw Neilson: a memorial
 Anon. (1946), Exhibition by fellows of the Bread and Cheese Club Art Group: at the Myer Gallery, from 2 July until 13 July 1946
 Anon. (1947), An English wreath for Gordon's grave
 Anon. (1955), Miles Franklin: a tribute, by some of her friends
 Archer, A. Lee (1941). Tom Collins (Joseph Furphy) as I knew him
 Barrett, Charles (1942), Art of the Australian Aboriginal
 Brogden, Stanley (1941), Tribute
 Brogden, Stanley (1942), The Australian freelance (Several editions published)
 Challman, Oscar (1967), Tributes in verse
 Cobb, Victor E. (1940), The etched work of Victor Cobb
 Croll, Robert Henderson (1946), An autobituary
 Dalziel, Kathleen (1941), "Known and not held"
 Doorly, Gerald S. (1943), The songs of the "Morning" (Words by John D. Morrison)
 Fleay, David (1947), Gliders of the gum trees: the most beautiful and enchanting Australian marsupials
 Grahame, Jim (1940), Call of the bush
 Gross, Alan (1948), Attainment: being a critical study of the literature of federation: with bibliography
 Lapthorne, Alice M. (1946), Mildura calling (Foreword by Bernard Cronin)
 Law, Marjorie J. (1945), Rain songs
 Malloch, Harry (1940), A brief history of the Bread and Cheese Club
 Malloch, H. W. (ed). (1943), Fellows all: The chronicles of the Bread and Cheese Club
 Malloch, H. W. (1951), Brief character sketch of John Kinmont Moir
 Mawdesley, Christina (1944), The corroboree tree and twelve shorter poems of Melbourne's early days of settlement
 Mountford, C. P. (1951). Art of Albert Namatjira
 O'Leary, Patrick I. (1939), The bread and cheese book: A selection of verses
 Pitts, Judith (1943), Cold hearthstone
 Swan, Robert A. (1946), Argonauts returned, and other poems (Foreword by R. H. Croll)
 Tierney, T. V. (1942), Nerangi Mundowie. (Lines written on viewing etching by Victor Cobb)
 Wannan, William (1943), The corporal's story
 West, Harvey (1945), Belsen
 Wye, W. J. (1941), Bush minstrelsy

References

Notes

Sources
 
 

Australian writers' organisations
Australian poetry
Defunct clubs and societies of Australia
1938 establishments in Australia
Organizations disestablished in 1988
Publishing companies of Australia
Australian artist groups and collectives